Cristian Josué Quintero Carvajal (born 23 May 2000) is a Panamanian football player who plays as a winger for Tauro, and the Panama national team.

International career
Quintero made his debut for the Panama national team in a 0-0 friendly tie with Peru on 16 January 2022.

Honours

Club
Tauro F.C.
Liga Panameña de Fútbol: 2018-19 Clausura, 2019 Apertura, 2021 Clausura

References

External links
 
 

1997 births
Living people
Sportspeople from Panama City
Panamanian footballers
Panama international footballers
Association football wingers
Tauro F.C. players
Liga Panameña de Fútbol players